The 1939 East Tennessee State Teachers Buccaneers football team was an American football team that represented State Teachers College, Johnson City—now known as East Tennessee State University (ETSU)—as a member of the Smoky Mountain Conference in the 1939 college football season. Led by eighth-year head coach Gene McMurray, the Buccaneers compiled an overall record of 5–3 with a mark of 4–2 in conference play, tying for second place in the Smoky Mountain Conference. 's 19–7 win over East Tennessee State was forfeited to the Buccaneers in December 1939 when the Smokey Mountain Conference commissioner, William O. Lowe, determined that King had used 14 ineligible players in the game.

Schedule

References

East Tennessee State Teachers
East Tennessee State Buccaneers football seasons
East Tennessee State Teachers Buccaneers football